is a 2001 Japanese anime television series based on NanaOn-Sha's PaRappa the Rapper video game series created by Masaya Matsuura and Rodney Greenblat. The series was produced by J.C.Staff and aired in Japan on Fuji TV between April 2001 and January 2002, running for thirty episodes. Episodes 29 and 30 aired together as a 1-hour special.

Summary
The series focuses on PaRappa, a cute and happy dog who enjoys music and dancing and often spends time with his friends PJ Berri, Katy Kat, and his love interest, Sunny Funny. Along with various characters who make returning appearances from the video games, the anime introduces several new characters who are exclusive to the TV series. These include Matt Major, PJ's friend from Club Fun, Paula Fox, Sunny's friend who was rivals with Katy, Pinto, PaRappa's little sister, and Gaster and Groober, a villainous duo who cause all sorts of mischief.

Production
During the production of PaRappa the Rapper 2, Sony wanted to develop a PaRappa anime aimed at children in order to boost merchandise sales. The series was a joint production effort between Fuji TV, SME Visual Works, and J.C.Staff. Rodney Greenblat, the art director for the PaRappa games, was asked to design new characters who would appear in the anime. He was against the idea of the show being aimed towards children and instead wanted it to be aimed towards teenagers, but this did not end up happening. He was not allowed to work on the anime at all aside from the character design, as the anime team did not want anyone pulled away from the production of the second game. In an interview with Gamasutra, Greenblat voiced his frustration about the production of the anime.

Music
The series' soundtrack was composed by series designer Masaya Matsuura, along with Yoshihisa Suzuki and Yasushi Kurobane. The series uses four pieces of theme music; two opening themes and two ending themes. The original soundtrack was released in two volumes by Sony Music Entertainment in 2001 on August 22 and December 19, respectively.

Voice cast

Episodes

References

External links
Official Fuji TV Website
Official Aniplex Website

2001 anime television series debuts
Japanese children's animated action television series
Japanese children's animated comedy television series
Japanese children's animated fantasy television series
Anime television series based on video games
Comedy anime and manga
Fuji TV original programming
J.C.Staff
PaRappa the Rapper
Production I.G
Works based on Sony Interactive Entertainment video games
Animated television series about dogs
Aniplex
Animated television series about cats
Animated television series about bears
Animated television series about rabbits and hares
Animated television series about foxes
Surreal comedy anime and manga
Surreal comedy television series
ja:パラッパラッパー#テレビアニメ